Miliana District is a district of Aïn Defla Province, Algeria.

Municipalities
The district further divides into two municipalities.
Miliana
Ben Allal

Notable people
 Mohamed Charef (1908-2011), theologian and mufti.
 Mohamed Belhocine (born 1951), Algerian medical scientist, professor of internal medicine and epidemiology.

Reference

Districts of Aïn Defla Province